Cepheus is a lunar impact crater that is located in the northeastern part of the Moon, within one crater diameter of the larger crater Franklin to the southeast. To the north-north-east is the flooded crater Oersted. The proximity of this formation to the lunar limb means it appears oblong when viewed from the Earth due to foreshortening.

This is a relatively young formation, and the rim is still sharp and well-defined. The exception is an even younger, bowl-shaped crater that lies across the northeast rim. This is a satellite crater designated Cepheus A. The remaining rim is nearly circular, with outward bulges to the north and south. The inner wall is terraced in places, most notably along the northwest wall. There is a central peak formation at the midpoint of the floor which stretches somewhat to the north and south.

Satellite craters
By convention these features are identified on lunar maps by placing the letter on the side of the crater midpoint that is closest to Cepheus.

References

 
 
 
 
 
 
 
 
 
 
 
 

Impact craters on the Moon